The 1953 Open Championship was held at the Lansdowne Club in London from 25 March - 2 April. Hashim Khan won his third consecutive title defeating Roy Wilson in the final.

Azam Khan the younger brother of Hashim Khan made his first appearance at the tournament.

Seeds

Results

+ amateur
^ seeded

References

Men's British Open Squash Championships
Men's British Open Championship
Men's British Open Squash Championship
Men's British Open Squash Championship
Men's British Open Squash Championship
Men's British Open Squash Championship
Squash competitions in London